Strongylognathus alpinus is a species of ant in the genus Strongylognathus. It is native to Switzerland.

References

Strongylognathus
Hymenoptera of Europe
Insects described in 1909
Taxonomy articles created by Polbot